The 1917 Colorado Agricultural Aggies football team represented Colorado Agricultural College (now known as Colorado State University) in the Rocky Mountain Conference (RMC) during the 1917 college football season.  In their seventh season under head coach Harry W. Hughes, the Aggies compiled a 1–7–1 record, finished last in the RMC, and were outscored by a total of 148 to 51.

Schedule

References

Colorado Agricultural
Colorado State Rams football seasons
Colorado Agricultural Aggies football